Ben khong chong (English: Wharf of Widows) is a 2000 Vietnamese film. The film won an award at the Berlin International Film Festival. It is directed by and featuring Trong Ninh Luu with Chau Minh and Ha Thuy.

External links 
 

2000 films
2000 in Vietnam
Films based on works by Vietnamese writers
Vietnamese-language films